Tephrelalis is a genus of tephritid  or fruit flies in the family Tephritidae.

Species
Tephrelalis sexincisa Korneyev, 1993

References

Tephritinae
Tephritidae genera
Diptera of Asia